Dominique Ponchardier (March 3, 1917, Saint-Étienne – April 17, 1986, Nice) was a French author and screenwriter who had been a member of the French Resistance during World War II, and later held positions as an intelligence officer, diplomat, colonial administrator and company president. He was a long-standing follower of Charles de Gaulle, at different times working for him in underground, intelligence, political, civil and diplomatic capacities.

Early life 
Born into a family of industrialists, Dominique Ponchardier received his secondary education in Saint-Étienne, Nice and Brest.

Anti-Nazi Resistance 
Ponchardier was doing his military service when World War II broke out. Wounded in the initial part of the war, he avoided being taken prisoner after the Fall of France, for which he later got the Escapees' Medal. He joined the French Resistance in October 1940 - a few months after the beginning of the Nazi occupation. In 1942, he participated in establishing the "Sosie" resistance network, together with his brother Pierre Ponchardier. He ended the war with the rank of Chef de Mission 1st class at the Directorate General of Studies and Research (DGER), the intelligence agency of the Free French Forces.

Gaullist activist 
In 1948 he was a member of the board of directors of the RPF, a political movement founded by Charles de Gaulle.

Author of spy and detective fiction 

In 1950, Ponchardier published the memoires of his wartime experiences, Les Pavés de l'enfer (The Cobblestones of Hell). This was followed, between 1954 and 1962, by a successful literary career under the pseudonyms A.L. Dominica and Antoine Dominique. He wrote an extensive series of Spy thrillers/Detective novels featuring a French intelligence operative and detective nicknamed "Le Gorille" ("The Gorilla"). He adapted some of his novels for the cinema.

After 1962 Ponchardier was too busy with various jobs and assignments to continue writing. His literary career resumed much later, in 1978 - his last book being published in 1983.

Anti-OAS campaign

In the aftermath of the Algerian war, in 1963, Ponchardier was recalled to active service and placed in charge of activities against the OAS. Already earlier, a militia which fought against the OAS with unofficial support from the  French government got named "Barbouzes" ("False Beards") - a name invented by Ponchardier and originally appearing in his fiction.

He was also a technical advisor to Michel Maurice-Bokanowski, Minister Of Industry.

Diplomat 
From 1964 to 1968, Ponchardier was the French Ambassador to Bolivia. As such, it was he who negotiated in 1967 the release and expulsion to France of Régis Debray, captured by the Bolivian soldiers while he was leaving the headquarters of revolutionary Che Guevara (who was killed shortly afterwards).

Colonial Administrator 

From 1969 to 1971, Ponchardier was Governor of the French Territory of the Afars and the Issas  (today Djibuti). At the time, this was France's last remaining toehold on the African continent, all other African colonies having been granted independence already. At the direction of President De Gaulle and despite international pressure, France was trying to hold on to this last colony, manipulating ethnic divisions between Somali and Afar inhabitants. In his tenure, Ponchardier was confronted with increasingly militant activities by the FLCS ("Front de Libération de la Côte des Somalis", Somali Coast Liberation Front) which in January 1970 claimed an attack on the popular Palm in Zinc, a bar in Djibouti City. Ponchardier's successors would give up attempting to stem the tide of independence, and France would leave Djibuti  in 1977.

Businessman 
Ponchardier's last active years were spent in the private sector. From 1971 to 1981, he was President of the Comptoirs français du développement du textile (French company for the development of textile fibers, now Dagris).

Death 

Ponchardier died on April 17, 1986 at Nice.

He is buried in Villefranche-sur-Mer (Alpes-Maritimes).

Writings 

Le Gorille (The Gorilla) series, signed A. L. Dominique or Antoine Dominique
This long-lasting series, running from 1954 to 1961, long interrupted when Ponchardier was otherwise busy and resumed between 1978 and 1983, is Ponchardier's most well-known literary ouvre. It relates the adventures of Geo Paquet, nicknamed  The Gorilla for his physique. The books were published in the "Black Series" (Série noire) of  Éditions Gallimard, and later by Plon. Fitting with the author's Gaullist sympathies, in Cold War espionage situations French Intelligence operatives are shown as acting in complete independence of - and often in strong aggressive rivalry with - their American and British counterparts, their mutual hostility nearly as strong as vis-a-vis the Soviet spies.

First Period (1954-1961) (numbers refer to the Série noire, which included many books by other authors)
 Le Gorille vous salue bien, Paris, 1954 (Adapted to cinema)
 Gaffe au Gorille !, Paris, 1954
 Trois gorilles, Paris, 1955
 Gorille sur champ d'azur, Paris, 1955
 Le Gorille et le barbu, Paris, 1955
 La valse des gorilles, Paris, 1955 (Adapted to cinema)    
 L'archipel aux Gorilles, Paris, 1955
 Le Gorille dans le Pot au noir, Paris, 1955
 Le Gorille sans cravate, Paris, 1955
 Le Gorille se mange froid, Paris, 1955
 Le Gorille en Bourgeois, Paris, 1956
 Le Gorille chez les Mandingues, Paris, 1956
 Poker Gorille, Paris, 1956
 Le Gorille et l'Amazone, Paris, 1956
 Le Gorille dans le cocotier, Paris, 1956
 Le Gorille compte ses abattis, Paris, 1956
 Entre le Gorille et les Corses, Paris, 1956
 Couscous Gorille, Paris, 1956
 Le Gorille dans la sciure, Paris, 1956
 Le Gorille en bretelles, Paris, 1956
 Paumé le Gorille !, Paris, 1956
 Le Gorille se met à table, Paris, 1956
 Le Gorille bille en tête, Paris, 1957
 Le Gorille crache le feu, Paris, 1957
 Le Gorille dans la verdine, Paris, 1957
 Le Gorille au frigo, Paris, 1957
 Le Gorille en pétard, Paris, 1957
 Le Gorille et les pelouseux, Paris, 1957
 Le Gorille sans moustache, Paris, 1957
 Le Gorille tatoué, Paris, 1958
 Le Gorille chez les parents terribles, Paris, 1958
 Le Gorille dans le cirage, Paris, 1958
 Le Gorille en révolution, Paris, 1958
 Le Pavé du Gorille, Paris, 1958
 Le Gorille a du poil au cœur, Paris, 1959
 Le Gorille en fleurs, Paris, 1959
 Le Gorille en est-il ?, Paris, 1959
 Le Gorille a mordu l'archevêque, Paris, 1960
 La Peau du Gorille, Paris, 1960
 Trois gorilles sur un bateau, Paris, 1960
 Le Gorille aux mains d'or, Paris, 1960
 Le Gorille et les sociétés secrètes, Paris, 1961
 Le Gorille enragé, Paris, 1961

Second Period (1978-1983)
 Oiseaux de nuit, Paris, Plon, coll. Le Gorille , 1978
 Irish Micmac, Paris, Plon, coll. Le Gorille , 1978
 Tendre est mon chien cuit, Paris, Plon, coll. Le Gorille , 1978
 L'African Terror, Paris, Plon, coll. Le Gorille , 1978
 Apocalypse Bazar, Paris, Plon, coll. Le Gorille , 1978
 Sweet Lupanar, Paris, Plon, coll. Le Gorille , 1979
 Dans le baba, Paris, Plon, coll. Le Gorille , 1979
 Feu au derche, Paris, Plon, coll. Le Gorille , 1979
 La Buveuse de santé, Paris, Plon, coll. Le Gorille , 1980
 ...Jusqu'au cou, Paris, Plon, coll. Le Gorille , 1980
 Le Con pathétique, Paris, Plon, coll. Le Gorille , 1980
 Semoule et foies blancs, Paris, Plon, coll. Le Gorille , 1981
 Du sang dans le caviar, Paris, Plon, coll. Le Gorille , 1981
 Le Gorille et les Corses, Paris, Plon, coll. Le Gorille , 1981
 Le Gorille paumé dans le soleil, Paris, Plon, coll. Le Gorille , 1982
 Le Gorille et la mauvaise soupe, Paris, Plon, coll. Le Gorille , 1982
 Le Gorille et la môme éblouie, Paris, Plon, coll. Le Gorille , 1982
 Le Gorille et la très grande faute, Paris, Plon, coll. Le Gorille , 1982
 Le Gorille et l'inconnu aux yeux blancs, Paris, Plon, coll. Le Gorille , 1983
 Le Gorille chez les Popofs, Paris, Plon, coll. Le Gorille , 1983
 Le Gorille en cavale, Paris, Plon, coll. Le Gorille , 1983

Other novels signed Antoine Dominique
 Les Suspects, Paris, Éditions France-Empire, 1957
 Passage à vide, Paris, Gallimard, Série noire , 1958
 L'Hôtel des Sans-Culottes, Paris, Gallimard, Série noire , 1959
 Pétrole, Paris, Gallimard, Série noire , 1959
 Le Manouche, Paris, Gallimard, Série noire , 1960
 Au poteau, Paris, Gallimard, Série noire , 1960
 Baobab, Paris, Gallimard, Série noire , 1961
 Au temps des cerises, Paris, Gallimard, Série noire , 1961
 Tête-de-fer, Paris, Gallimard, 1963

Novels signed Dominique Ponchardier
 La Dame de Tadjoura, Paris, Gallimard, 1973
 La Mort du Condor, Paris, Gallimard, 1976

Memoires signed Dominique Ponchardier
 Les Pavés de l'enfer, Paris, Gallimard, 1950 ; republished Paris, J'ai lu Leur aventure , 1969; another variation published 1973 as 'Les Pavés de l'enfer, la Résistance en France, 1940-1944 La Dame de Tadjoura (1973)

 Filmography 
 1958: Les Suspects (The Suspects)  by Jean Dréville with  Charles Vanel
 1959: The Mask of the Gorilla by Bernard Borderie, with Lino Ventura in the title role.
 1960: La Valse du Gorille by Bernard Borderie, with  Roger Hanin in the title role.
 1961: L'Exécution ('TV') by Maurice Cazeneuve with René Dary
 1962: Le Gorille a mordu l'archevêque by Maurice Labro, with  Roger Hanin in the title role.
 1990: Le Gorille : TV mini-series with 13 episodes, by (Duccio Tessari, Roger Hanin, Patrick Jamain, Pierre Granier-Deferre, Jean Delannoy...), with Karim Allaoui in the title role, Le Gorille se mange froid''

Decorations 

 Commander in the Légion d'honneur
 Compagnon de la Libération - decree of 27 December 1945
 Croix de guerre 1939-1945 : (4 citations)
 Médaille de la résistance with a rosette
 Médaille des évadés
 Médaille des Blessés

References

External links
"Dominique Ponchardier Dies, A Hero of French Resistance hero", New York Times.
 Notice de personne, Ponchardier, Dominique (1917-1986) forme internationale / La dame de Tadjoura, Dominique Ponchardier, 1973 WW, France 1985-1986 / Hommes et destins, VIII. Académie des sciences d'Outre-mer, 1988 / Dictionnaire des littératures policières, 2007 / "Livres Hebdo", n ̊19, 5 mai 1986 / Monde, 1986-04-19 et 1986-04-26
Dominique Ponchardier sur le site de l'Ordre de la Libération
 Dominique Ponchardier (1917-1986), bnf.fr

1917 births
1986 deaths
Writers from Saint-Étienne
Rally of the French People politicians
French crime fiction writers
French male screenwriters
20th-century French screenwriters
Companions of the Liberation
People of the Algerian War
Commandeurs of the Légion d'honneur
20th-century French novelists
French male novelists
20th-century French male writers
French Resistance members
French diplomats
History of Djibouti
French colonial governors and administrators
French industrialists